Nerolic acid, also known as (Z)-3,7-Dimethyl-2,6-octadienoic acid, is an organically-derived chemical.

In nature 
Nerolic acid is found in the Nasonov scent gland of honey-bees along with geraniol, geranic acid, citral, farnesol, and nerol.  Of these, nerolic acid, geraniol, and farnesol are present in the highest proportions.. 

It is one of the five compounds that are part of the essential oils of Myrcia Ovata. 

It is a compound also found in great quantity in Myrcia lundiana and it possess antifungal properties against pathogens such as Fusarium solani, and Lasiodiplodia theobromae. Both Myrcia Ovata and Myrcia lundiana are part of the Myrtaceae family plant, both containing a certain percentage of Nerolic acid compound.

In addition to this, Nerolic acid is also a principal chemical compound of essential oils of lemongrass, and is also believed to possess antifungal properties.

References 

Monoterpenes
Carboxylic acids